The Pegasus World Cup Filly and Mare Turf Invitational is a Grade III American Thoroughbred horse race for invited fillies and mares that are four years old or older, over a distance of  miles on the turf held annually in January at Gulfstream Park, Hallandale Beach, Florida.  The event currently carries a purse of $500,000.

History 
The race was inaugurated in 14 March 2001 as the Marshua's River Stakes over a much shorter distance of about 5 furlongs and named after the winning mare Marshua's River who won nine races in her career including the Grade III Suwannee River Stakes.

The event has been run at the current distance of  miles since 2005.

The event was upgraded to a Grade III event in 2011.

In 2021 the event was run over a distance of 1 mile. 

In 2022 Gulfstream Park administration rebranded the event as part of the Pegasus World Cup and renamed the event as Pegasus World Cup Filly and Mare Turf Invitational with a significant increase in the purse to $500,000. The distance of the event was reverted back to  miles.

Records
Speed record: 
1:37.87 – Dedication (FR) (2004)

Margins: 
  lengths – Dance the Slew (2003)

Most wins:
 2 – Sandiva (IRE)  (2016, 2017)

Most wins by a jockey
 3 – Javier Castellano (2016, 2017, 2019)

Most wins by a trainer
 4 – Christophe Clement (2004, 2007, 2014, 2015)

Most wins by an owner:
 2 – Al Shaqab Racing (2016, 2017)

Winners

Legend:

See also
 List of American and Canadian Graded races

External links
 2021–22 Gulfstream Park Media Guide

References

Horse races in the United States
Graded stakes races in the United States
2001 establishments in Florida
Recurring sporting events established in 2001
Horse races in Florida
Flat horse races for four-year-old fillies
Grade 3 stakes races in the United States